K31KV-D, virtual channel 16 (UHF digital channel 31), known on-air as CTV, is a low-powered television station licensed to St. James, Minnesota, United States.

The station is owned by the Cooperative Television Association of Southern Minnesota, an organization that operates several translator-style stations, including a few of them that rebroadcasts some of the signals of Twin Cities market stations that do not reach the St. James/Mankato area. At the time of the organization's 1993 foundation, CBS affiliate KEYC-TV (channel 12) was the only locally based full-power station in the market. The station's transmitter is located in extreme northern Watonwan County near its boundary with Brown County, along Minnesota State Highway 4 near Godahl.

Digital channels
The station's signal is multiplexed:

References

External links
Community Television Association of Southern Minnesota

Low-power television stations in the United States
31KV
Independent television stations in the United States